The 2011–12 Georgian Ice Hockey League season was the second season of the Georgian Ice Hockey League, the top level of ice hockey in Georgia. Four teams participated in the league, and the Ice Knights Tbilisi won the championship.

Regular season

External links
Season on eurohockey.com

Geo
Georgian Ice Hockey League seasons